Abbas Ahmed Khamis (born 13 June 1983) is a footballer from Bahrain. He plays for Bahraini football club Sitra, and has played in the Bahrain national football team. He was part of the Bahrain team in AFC Asian Cup 2007 and 2011

External links

1983 births
Living people
Bahraini footballers
Bahrain international footballers
2007 AFC Asian Cup players
2011 AFC Asian Cup players
Footballers at the 2006 Asian Games
Association football goalkeepers
Asian Games competitors for Bahrain
Sitra Club players
Al-Ahli Club (Manama) players
Hidd SCC players